Piruna pirus, the russet skipperling, is a species of intermediate skipper in the butterfly family Hesperiidae. It is found in North America.

The MONA or Hodges number for Piruna pirus is 3983.

References

Further reading

External links

 

Heteropterinae
Articles created by Qbugbot